Smart Materials and Structures is a monthly peer-reviewed scientific journal covering technical advances in smart materials, systems, structures and device engineering.

The initial editors-in-chief starting in 1992 were Vijay K. Varadan (Pennsylvania State University), Gareth J. Knowles (Grumman Corporation), and Richard O. Claus (Virginia Tech); in 2008 Ephrahim Garcia (Cornell University) took over as editor-in-chief until 2014. Christopher S. Lynch (University of California, Los Angeles) assumed the position of editor-in-chief in 2015.

Abstracting and indexing
The journal is abstracted and indexed in:

According to the Journal Citation Reports, the journal has a 2020 impact factor of 3.585.

References

External links

IOP Publishing academic journals
Materials science journals
Monthly journals
Publications established in 1992
English-language journals